Right Frequency II is the sequel to the 1998 sitcom Right Frequency. The cast was expanded with Nick Shen and Joey Swee, having just joined the media industry.

Plot
(To be added)
Nick Shen is a popular Singaporean Actor/Musician.  He is well known for his operas as well as appearances on numerous television shows.

Singaporean television series